Drymalia is a former municipality on the island of Naxos, in the Cyclades, Greece. Since the 2011 local government reform it is part of the municipality Naxos and Lesser Cyclades, of which it is a municipal unit. Its population was 5,244 at the 2011 census. The seat of the municipality was in Chalkeio (pop. 408), located at the center of the island. The largest town is Filoti, with a population of 1,477 inhabitants. Other large towns are Aperathos, Koronos, Damarionas, and Koronis. The municipal unit shares the island with the municipal unit of Naxos (city), which comprises about 30 percent of the island of Naxos, at its western end.

References

Naxos
Populated places in Naxos (regional unit)